Heidi Browning is an American corporate executive, currently working as chief marketing officer of the National Hockey League. She was named the fourth most powerful woman in hockey in 2020 by Sportsnet and to Forbes' 30 Most Powerful Women In U.S. Sports 2018. A University of Colorado Boulder graduate, she previously worked as an executive at Universal McCann and Pandora.

References

Living people
Women ice hockey executives
National Hockey League executives
Year of birth missing (living people)
University of Colorado Boulder alumni
Chief marketing officers